The Boys from Syracuse is a musical with music by Richard Rodgers and lyrics by Lorenz Hart, based on William Shakespeare's play The Comedy of Errors, as adapted by librettist George Abbott.  The score includes swing and other contemporary rhythms of the 1930s.  The show was the first musical based on a Shakespeare play. The Comedy of Errors was itself loosely based on a Roman play, The Menaechmi, or the Twin Brothers, by Plautus.

The show premiered on Broadway in 1938 and Off-Broadway in 1963, with later productions including a West End run in 1963 and in a Broadway revival in 2002.  A film adaptation was released in 1940.  Well-known songs from the score include "Falling in Love with Love", "This Can't Be Love" and "Sing for Your Supper".

Production history
Abbott directed and George Balanchine choreographed the original production, which opened on Broadway at the Alvin Theater on November 23, 1938, after tryouts in New Haven, Connecticut and Boston. The show closed on June 10, 1939 after 235 performances. It starred Eddie Albert (Antipholus of Syracuse), Ronald Graham (Antipholus of Ephesus), Teddy Hart (Dromio of Ephesus), Jimmy Savo (Dromio of Syracuse), Muriel Angelus (Adriana) and Marcy Westcott (Luciana). Scenic and lighting design were by Jo Mielziner and costumes were by Irene Sharaff.

The show was revived Off-Broadway, opening at Theatre Four on April 15, 1963 and running for 500 performances. Directed by Christopher Hewett, the cast featured Stuart Damon (Antipholus of Syracuse), Clifford David (Antipholus of Ephesus), Danny Carroll (Dromio of Syracuse), Rudy Tronto (Dromio of Ephesus), Ellen Hanley (Adriana), Julienne Marie (Luciana), and Karen Morrow (Luce).

A West End production opened at the Theatre Royal, Drury Lane on November 7, 1963 based on the off-Broadway production, starring Denis Quilley (Antipholus of Ephesus), Maggie Fitzgibbon (Luce), Paula Hendrix (Luciana), Pat Turner (Courtesan), Sonny Farrar (Dromio of Ephesus), Adam Deane (Angelo), John Adams (Sergeant), Edward Atienza (Sorcerer), Ronnie Corbett (Dromio of Syracuse), Lynn Kennington (Adriana) and Bob Monkhouse (Antipholus of Syracuse).

A film version was released on August 9, 1940 by Universal Pictures. Directed by A. Edward Sutherland, the film starred Allan Jones in the dual roles of the two Antipholuses, Joe Penner in the dual roles of the Dromios, Martha Raye and Irene Hervey.

A Stratford Festival of Canada production opened on May 19, 1986 and ran for 69 performances.  It featured Colm Feore (Antipholus of Ephesus), Geraint Wyn Davies (Antiophlus of Syracuse), Susan Wright (Luce), Goldie Semple (the Courtesan), and Eric McCormack.
The production was filmed by the Canadian Broadcasting Corporation and was broadcast in late 1986.

A revival directed by Judi Dench was mounted at the Regent's Park Open Air Theatre in London in July through August 1991, and toured the UK in September and October 1991. Louise Gold played Adriana.

The Roundabout Theatre revival opened on Broadway at the American Airlines Theatre on August 18, 2002 and ran for 73 performances and 29 previews.  The revival featured a new book by Nicky Silver based on the original book.  It was directed by Scott Ellis with choreography by Rob Ashford, and the cast featured Jonathan Dokuchitz (Antipholus of Syracuse), Tom Hewitt (Antipholus of Ephesus), Lee Wilkof (Dromio of Syracuse), Chip Zien (Dromio of Ephesus), Erin Dilly (Luciana) and Lauren Mitchell (Adriana).

The Shakespeare Theatre Company of Washington, DC, presented a semi-staged concert version at its Sidney Harman Hall, November 4–6, 2011, with direction by Alan Paul, musical direction by George Fulginiti-Shakar, and artistic direction by Michael Kahn, with the concert adaptation by David Ives.  The production starred Anastasia Barzee, Helen Carey, Anderson Davis, Ben Davis, Natascia Diaz, Alexander Gemignani, Adam Heller, Benjamin Horen, John Horton, Nehal Joshi, Leslie Kritzer, Michael McGrath, Michael Nansel, Matt Pearson, Tim Rogan, Thomas Adrian Simpson, and Betsy Wolfe.

The show's Asian premiere was in Singapore, performed by LASALLE College of the Arts. The production run was at The Singapore Airlines Theatre in March 2012. The show was directed by Tony Knight, musical direction by Bronwyn Gibson, and choreography by Tiffany Wrightson. The cast included Linden Furnell, Taryn Erickson, Mina Kaye, James Simpson, Gimbey Dela Cruz, Elle-May Patterson, Safia Hanifah, Michelle Kraiwitchaicharoen and Oda Maria.

Plot
Identical twins Antipholus of Ephesus and Antipholus of Syracuse were separated from each other  in a shipwreck as young children.  Their servants, both named Dromio, are also long-separated identical twins.  When the pair from Syracuse come to Ephesus, a comedy of errors and mistaken identities ensues when the wives of the Ephesians, Adriana and her servant Luce, mistake the two strangers for their husbands.  Adriana's sister Luciana and the Syracuse Antipholus fall in love.  But all ends happily.

Musical numbers

Act I
 "I Had Twins" – A Sergeant, Aegon, Duke of Ephesus and The Crowd
 "Dear Old Syracuse" – Antipholus of Syracuse and Dromio of Syracuse
 "What Can You Do with a Man?" – Dromio of Ephesus and Luce
 "Falling in Love with Love" – Adriana
 "The Shortest Day of the Year" – Adriana and Antipholus of Ephesus
 "This Can't Be Love" – Antipholus of Syracuse and Luciana
 "Ladies' Choice" (Ballet) Courtesan, Antipholus of Ephesus, Pygmalion & Galatea, Amazons, Assistant Courtesan and Adriana (not in 2002 revival)
 "Let Antipholus In" – Entire Company (not in 2002 revival)

Act II
 "You Took Advantage of Me" – The Courtesans (in 2002 revival, from Present Arms, 1928)
 "Ladies of the Evening" – Singing Policeman, Another Policeman, Policemen and Courtesans (not in 2002 revival)
 "He and She" – Dromio of Syracuse and Luce
 "You Have Cast Your Shadow on the Sea" – Antipholus of Syracuse and Luciana
 "Come With Me" – A Sergeant and Syracuse Policemen
 "Big Brother" – Dromio of Ephesus (comes before "Come With Me" in 2002 revival, and sung by both Dromios) 
 "Sing for Your Supper" – Adriana, Luce, Luciana,
 "Oh, Diogenes!" – Courtesan and Full Company

The 2002 revival ended with:
 "Hurrah! Hurroo (reprise) (Sing for Your Supper)" – Madam, Courtesans, Luce, Adriana, Luciana, and the Crowd 
 "This Can't Be Love" (reprise) – The Company

Roles and original cast

The Masks: Robert Sidney, Harry Peterson
Singing Policeman: Bob Lawrence
Another Policeman: James Wilkinson
Antipholus of Ephesus: Ronald Graham
Dromio of Ephesus: Teddy Hart
Dancing Policeman: George Church
Tailor: Clifford Dunstan
Tailor's Apprentice: Burl Ives
Antipholus of Syracuse: Eddie Albert
Dromio of Syracuse: Jimmy Savo
Merchant of Syracuse: Byron Shores
Duke of Ephesus: Carroll Ashburn
Aegeon: John O'Shaughnessy
Luce: Wynn Murray
Adriana: Muriel Angelus
Luciana: Marcy Westcott
Sorcerer: Owen Martin
Courtesan: Betty Bruce
Secretary to Courtesan: Heidi Vosseler
Angelo: John Clarke
Merchant of Ephesus: Clifford Dunstan
Seeress: Florence Fair

References

External links

Information from LorenzHart.org website
Curtain Up review of 2002 revival
Listing at guidetomusicaltheatre.com

Plot summary & casting breakdown

1938 musicals
Broadway musicals
Musicals by Rodgers and Hart
Musicals based on plays
Plays and musicals based on The Comedy of Errors
Plays set in ancient Greece
Twins in fiction